Paul Marmet; (20 May 1932 – 20 May 2005) was a Canadian physicist and professor, best known for developing, along with his mentor Larkin Kerwin, a high resolution electron selector for the study of ionic electronic states. This instrument, along with a mass spectrometer he developed, had an energy resolution superior to previous instruments, and was widely used by scientists for electron scattering studies which led to the discovery of enhanced vibrational excitation in nitrogen, and of Feshbach resonances.

Marmet and his research group used the electron selector to discover atomic and molecular states which are excited by electron impact but not by photons, such as doubly excited states which disobey spectroscopic selection rules, and negative-ion resonances in which the incident electron is temporarily attached to the target molecule.

Career
Beginning in 1967 Marmet served as director of the laboratory for Atomic and Molecular Physics at Laval University in Quebec City, Canada, serving in that role until 1982. For the year 1981-82 he was president of the Canadian Association of Physicists. From 1983 to 1990, Marmet was a senior researcher at the Herzberg Institute of Astrophysics of the National Research Council of Canada in Ottawa.  In 1990 Marmet was an Assistant Professor of Physics at the University of Ottawa.

Opposition to quantum mechanics, relativity, and the big bang
In his later years Marmet was an outspoken critic of the Copenhagen Interpretation of Quantum Mechanics, the theory of relativity, and the Big Bang cosmological model.  In 1993 he self-published a book entitled "Absurdities in Modern Physics". He also maintained a web site devoted to his ideas. His views have not found acceptance within the mainstream scientific community.

Bibliography
Paul Marmet published more than 100 original research papers, as well as a number of books, websites and animated demonstrations for the teaching of Physics.

References

1932 births
2005 deaths
Canadian physicists
Academic staff of Université Laval
Officers of the Order of Canada
People from Lévis, Quebec
Université Laval alumni
Presidents of the Canadian Association of Physicists